Angel Eyes is a 2014 South Korean television series starring Lee Sang-yoon and Koo Hye-sun. It aired on SBS from April 5 to June 15, 2014, on Saturdays and Sundays at 21:55 (KST) for 20 episodes.

Plot
Yoon Soo-wan (Ku Hye-sun) and Park Dong-joo (Lee Sang-yoon) were each other's first loves, but were forced to separate due to painful family circumstances. Soo-wan, who had been blind, eventually undergoes an eye transplant surgery that restores her sight.

Twelve years later, Soo-wan now works as an emergency rescue worker, while Dong-joo is a surgeon. They meet each other again, but Soo-wan is engaged to a neurosurgeon, Kang Ji-woon (Kim Ji-seok). Knowing this, Park Dong-joo decided to keep quiet and not reveal his identity to Soo-wan, and also decided to go back. Will Soo-wan realize that Doctor Dylan Park is her first love, Park Dong-joo? Will they end up together despite all the obstacles that they are going to face?

Cast

Main
Lee Sang-yoon as Park Dong-joo / Dylan Park / Darren Park
Kang Ha-neul as teenage Park Dong-joo
 as young Park Dong-joo
A smart and warm-hearted doctor who wants to protect the woman he loves. As a teenager, he was sent to America after his mother's death from a hit-and-run accident.

Koo Hye-sun as Yoon Soo-wan / Sienna Yoon 
Nam Ji-hyun as teenage Yoon Soo-wan 
Roh Jeong-eui as young Yoon Soo-wan
A legally-blind woman who gets her vision back in an operation and decides to embrace life with passion by becoming an emergency rescue worker. Tomboyish Soo-wan still fondly remembers her first love from 12 years ago.

Supporting

Seyoung Hospital
Kim Ji-seok as Kang Ji-woon / Jiro Kang
A thoughtful neurosurgeon who is dating Soo-wan.
Jung Jin-young as Yoon Jae-bum / Joseph Yoon  
Soo-wan's father.
Jung Ae-ri as Oh Young-ji
 as Moon Je-ha
 as Kim Ho-jin
Park Jin-joo as Kim Yoon-jung
Lee Seung-hyung as Sung Hyun-ho
 as Choi Jin-sang

Seyoung Fire Station
Gong Hyung-jin as Ki Woon-chan
Seungri as Teddy Seo
A Korean-American who returns to Korea to become an emergency rescue worker. He speaks Korean with a Chungcheong accent after being raised by his grandmother in the south. Teddy falls in love at first sight with Park Hye-joo.
 as Joo Tae-sub
 as Park Chang-hyun
Lee Ha-yool as Kim Jin-soo

Seyoung Police Station
Hyun Jyu-ni as Cha Min-soo / Miriam Cha
Shin Hye-sun as young Cha Min-soo
Kwon Hae-hyo as Kim Woo-chul
 as Kim Young-rak

Extended cast
 as Park Hye-joo
 as young Park Hye-joo / Hazel Park
 as Han Woo-jung
Jung Ji-hoon as Ki Jin-mo
Heo Jung-eun

Cameos 
Kim Yeo-jin as Yoo Jung-hwa
  as Park Hyung-shik
 Yoo Jae-myung as Seon-woo
 Jung Hae-kyun as the owner of the house Soo Wan lives in (Ep.19–20)

Ratings

Awards and nominations

References

External links
 

2014 South Korean television series debuts
2014 South Korean television series endings
South Korean medical television series
South Korean romance television series
Seoul Broadcasting System television dramas
Korean-language television shows
Television series by Studio S